Mark Anderson (born 15 May 1952) is an Australian former swimmer. He competed in the men's 200 metre freestyle at the 1968 Summer Olympics.

References

External links
 

1952 births
Living people
Australian male freestyle swimmers
Olympic swimmers of Australia
Swimmers at the 1968 Summer Olympics
Place of birth missing (living people)
20th-century Australian people